Spectromancer is a computer game developed by Apus Software and Three Donkeys LLC. The game was released in October 2008. The expansion League of Heroes, Truth & Beauty, and Gathering of Power are upgrade to the game rather than a stand-alone expansion and were released respectively at 2010, 2011, and 2013.

The game was developed by Magic: The Gathering creator Richard Garfield, Alexey Stankevich (creator of Astral Tournament and Astral Masters) and Skaff Elias. Spectromancer's gameplay revolves around a playing-card dynamic. In the single-player campaign, the player traverses a mythical world collecting various cards to use in duels. There is also an online arena, where a player can duel other players, and a high score list. in January 2015 a champion tournament was created, in which the best players competed. The tournament was won by Plynx, second place for GrimJ0ker, third Krugopryad.

Unlike most collectible card games, players do not construct a deck before the game starts. Instead, at the beginning of each duel, each player is randomly given twenty cards, four from each of five elements. (The four classical elements, plus a fifth element of the player's choice.) These cards vary in mana cost and function. Each turn, the player gains one mana in each element, and may play a single card. Playing a card does not cause it to become "used"; there is no concept of a hand or a discard pile. The game ends once one player succeeds in bringing the other player's life total down to 0.

The free trial offers the full single player mode, and online mode currently with limited number of player versus player duels per day. The full, purchased version offers twelve classes as of 1.2, with their corresponding specialties.

Jagdish Chanda has developed the flash version of this game in 2009, 2010 and 2011. All three version of the flash were a big hit among the web game.

In 2020 the developer released the game engine's source code under an open source software license, the BSD-license, on GitHub.

References

External links
Official website
Flash Version of game

2008 video games
Indie video games
Digital collectible card games
IOS games
Richard Garfield games
Windows games
Multiplayer and single-player video games
Video games developed in Belarus
Commercial video games with freely available source code
Open-source video games